Cameron Norrie defeated Reilly Opelka in the final, 7–6(7–1), 7–6(7–4) to win the singles title at the 2022 Delray Beach Open.

Hubert Hurkacz was the defending champion, but chose not to defend his title.

Seeds
The top four seeds received a bye into the second round.

Draw

Finals

Top half

Bottom half

Qualifying

Seeds

Qualifiers

Lucky loser

Qualifying draw

First qualifier

Second qualifier

Third qualifier

Fourth qualifier

References

External links
 Main draw
 Qualifying draw

Delray Beach Open - Singles
2022 Singles
Delray Beach Open – Singles
Delray Beach Open – Singles